Nickerson–South Hutchinson USD 309 is a unified school district headquartered in South Hutchinson, Kansas, United States.  The district includes the communities of Nickerson, South Hutchinson, Willowbrook, Yaggy, The Highlands, and nearby rural areas.

Schools
The school district operates the following schools:
 Nickerson High School
 Reno Valley Middle School
 Nickerson Elementary School
 South Hutchinson Elementary School
 Central State Academy

See also
 List of high schools in Kansas
 List of unified school districts in Kansas
 Kansas State Department of Education
 Kansas State High School Activities Association

References

External links
 

School districts in Kansas
Education in Reno County, Kansas